Rupeni Rabici (born 27 November 1996) is a Fijian footballer who plays as a defender for Fijian club Nadi and the Fiji national team.

Club career
Rabici started his career with Ba. However he played mainly for their youth team. Before he really broke into the first team of Ba he joined Nadi.

National team
In 2017 Rabici was called up by coach Christophe Gamel for the Fiji national football team. He made his debut on November 19, 2017, in a 2–0 loss against Estonia when he came in in the 90 minute of play for Laisenia Naioko.

References

Fijian footballers
Association football defenders
Ba F.C. players
Nadi F.C. players
Fiji international footballers
Living people
1996 births
Dreketi F.C. players